Hinduism (힌두교 Hindugyo) is practiced among South Korea's small Indian and Nepali immigrant community. However, Hindu traditions such as Yoga and Vedanta have attracted interest among young Koreans. Hindu temples in South Korea are mostly concentrated in Gyeonggi Province and the metropolitan city of Seoul. Here is a list of Hindu temples in South Korea:

Seoul 
 Sri Radha Shyamasundar Mandir
 Sri Lakshmi Narayanan Temple, Seoul
 Himalayan Meditation and Yoga Sadhana Mandir, Seocho, Seoul

Gyeonggi-do 
 Sri Sri Radha Krishna temple, Uijeongbu

See also
 Buddhism in Korea
 Hinduism in Korea
 Indians in Korea
 Koreans in India
 Memorial of Heo Hwang-ok, Ayodhya 
 India–South Korea relations
 India – North Korea relations
 List of Hindu temples outside India

References

 
Lists of religious buildings and structures in South Korea